The 1935 Philadelphia Eagles season was their third in the league. The team failed to improve on their previous output of 4–7, winning only two games. They failed to qualify for the playoffs for the third consecutive season. A home game against the Boston Redskins scheduled for November 17 was canceled due to snow and rain.

Off Season 
The Eagles move their training camp to a private school, the Chestnut Hill Academy in Philadelphia, Pennsylvania

Regular season

Schedule

Standings

Playoffs 
The Eagles failed to make the playoffs

Roster 
(All time List of Philadelphia Eagles players in franchise history)

References 

Philadelphia Eagles seasons
Philadelphia Eagles
Philadelphia Eag